Gastone Pierini (27 September 1899 – 17 September 1967) was an Italian lightweight weightlifter. He competed in the 1924, 1928, 1932 and 1936 Summer Olympics and won a bronze medal in 1932. He was born in Italy, but lived most of his life in Egypt, and spent five years in a war camp near El-Fayid during World War II. After that he immigrated to Brazil, where he died in 1967.

References

External links
 

1899 births
1967 deaths
Italian male weightlifters
Olympic weightlifters of Italy
Weightlifters at the 1924 Summer Olympics
Weightlifters at the 1928 Summer Olympics
Weightlifters at the 1932 Summer Olympics
Weightlifters at the 1936 Summer Olympics
Olympic bronze medalists for Italy
Olympic medalists in weightlifting
Medalists at the 1932 Summer Olympics
20th-century Italian people